Migala, Migaľa, or Migała is a surname. Notable people with the surname include:

 Lukáš Migaľa (born 1990), Slovak footballer
 Monika Migała (born 1987), Polish handball player

See also
 

Polish-language surnames